The Madonna with St. Catherine of Alexandria and St. Martin of Tours is a painting by the Italian Renaissance painter Filippino Lippi created c. 1485–1488. It is housed in the church of Santo Spirito of Florence. St. John the Baptist, the patron saint of Florence, appears on the right hand side of the Virgin. The infant Christ turns towards his precursor also a juvenile, dressed in animal skins as appropriate for a desert saint and whose staff has a crossbar referring to the Crucifixion to come. 

The painting is also known as Pala de' Nerli from the name of the commissioners, Tanai de' Nerli and his wife Nanna, which are portrayed at the sides as donors. the choice of the saints is also connected to the personality of Nerli, who was particularly devoted to St. Catherine (he baptized his daughter with her name) and was a member of the Company of San Martino de' Buonomini.

The background shows the influence of the Flemish school but also from the ancient architecture. Several scholars have dated it to 1494 due to an alleged reference to the presence of Charles VIII of France in the city. However, the numerous decorations hinting to the classical antiquities (the frieze in the loggia's pilasters, the goat head on the Virgin's seat and the frieze with the fight of the Tritons) would place it soon after his return from Rome.

Behind the loggia is an unusual scene of Florence with the Gate or Porta San Frediano and de' Nerli's palace. The commissioner is portrayed at the latter's door while hugging his daughter in front of his wife, while a groom cares his horse.

References
Page at artonline.it 

1490s paintings
Paintings by Filippino Lippi
Paintings of the Madonna and Child
Paintings depicting John the Baptist